The Standard Time Act of 1918, also known as the Calder Act, was the first United States federal law implementing Standard time and Daylight saving time in the United States. It defined five time zones for the United States and authorized the Interstate Commerce Commission to define the limits of each time zone.

The section concerning daylight saving time was repealed by the act titled An Act For the repeal of the daylight-saving law, over President Woodrow Wilson's veto.

Section 264 of the act mistakenly placed most of the state of Idaho (south of the Salmon River) in UTC−06:00 CST (Central Standard Time), but was amended in 2007 by Congress to UTC−07:00 MST (Mountain Standard Time). MST was observed prior to the correction.

See also
Time in the United States
Uniform Time Act

References

Time in the United States
Daylight saving time in the United States
65th United States Congress
1918 in law